This is a list of the chairpersons that the Sami Parliament of Sweden has had since its establishment on January 1, 1993:

Sources

Sweden, Sami
Lists of political office-holders in Sweden

Politics of Sweden
Sámi in Sweden
Speakers
Speakers
Sámi-related lists